is a former Japanese football player.

Playing career
Morita was born in Nagoya on July 13, 1976. After graduating from Komazawa University, he joined J1 League club Urawa Reds in 1999. Although initially he played many matches as center forward, he could not score a goal and his opportunity to play decreased. The club was also relegated to J2 League from 2000. In 2001, he played for Cerezo Osaka and Kawasaki Frontale. However he could not play many matches in both clubs. In 2002, he moved to J2 club Omiya Ardija. He played many matches as forward until 2003. However he could hardly play in the match in 2004. In August 2004, he moved to Sanfrecce Hiroshima. Although he played as regular player in 2004, he could hardly play in the match in 2005. In 2006, he was converted to defender and played many matches as left back of three backs defense for long time. The club won the 2nd place 2007 Emperor's Cup. Although he could not play at all in the match for injury in 2010, he came back in 2011 season. In 2012, he moved to J2 club Ventforet Kofu. He became a regular player as center back from the middle of 2012 and the club won the champions in 2012 and was promoted to J1 from 2013. From 2014, he was converted to forward because there were few forward players in the club. However his opportunity to play decreased from 2015. In 2017, he moved to J2 club Thespakusatsu Gunma. He played as forward and retired end of 2017 season at age of 41.

Club statistics

References

External links

Profile at Thespakusatsu Gunma 

1976 births
Living people
Komazawa University alumni
Association football people from Aichi Prefecture
Japanese footballers
J1 League players
J2 League players
Urawa Red Diamonds players
Cerezo Osaka players
Kawasaki Frontale players
Omiya Ardija players
Sanfrecce Hiroshima players
Ventforet Kofu players
Thespakusatsu Gunma players
Association football forwards